Al-Dhira' and similar spellings (e.g. "Alderaan", "Al-Dhirá'án", "Aldryan") is a disused name for the two pairs of stars α and β Canis Minoris (Procyon and Gomeisa) and α and β Geminorum (Castor and Pollux). 

The name was taken from Arabic al-dhirā`ain الذراعين (meaning "the two forearms" or "the two front paws" or "the two cubit measuring rods"). It may refer to a Bedouin asterism of an enlarged rampant Lion centered on Leo and stretching over a quarter of the sky with its forepaws at these two pairs of stars. However, it may originally have referred to the "measuring rods" meaning, but an astronomer whose native language was not Arabic supposed that it meant "the two forepaws" literally and invented the enlarged Lion constellation.

References

Asterisms (astronomy)
Gemini (constellation)
Canis Minor